The 1990–91 season saw the introduction of the Apertura and Clausura system in Argentina. Newell's Old Boys won the Apertura 1990 and Boca Juniors won the Clausura 1991. The two teams faced each other in a playoff to decide the overall champions, which was won by Newell's. There was a great deal of controversy over this as Boca Juniors had won the Clausura without losing a game, but losing the playoff had cost them their first official championship since 1981. In subsequent seasons the winners of both the Apertura and Clausura have been officially recognised as champions.

Torneo Apertura ("Opening" Tournament)

Newell's Old Boys to play in the championship decider
Teams highlighted in blue qualified for the Liguilla Pre-Libertadores

Relegation

There is no relegation after the Apertura. For the relegation results of this tournament see below

Torneo Clausura ("Closing" Tournament)

Boca Juniors to play in the championship decider
Teams highlighted in blue qualified for the Liguilla Pre-Libertadores

Championship decider

Newell's Old Boys win the 1990-1991 championship and qualify for the Copa Libertadores 1992.
Boca Juniors enter the Liguilla Pre-Libertadores.

Top Scorer
The top scorer over the combined championships was Esteban González of Vélez Sársfield, with 18 goals.

Relegation

Liguilla Pre-Libertadores
Teams highlighted in light blue, in the league tables above qualified for the Liguilla Pre-Libertadores.
Quarter-finals

Semi-finals

Final

San Lorenzo qualify for the Copa Libertadores 1992.

Argentine clubs in international competitions

References

Argentina 1990-1991 by Pablo Ciullini  at rsssf.
Argentina 1990s by Osvaldo José Gorgazzi and Victor Hugo Kurhy at rsssf.
Copa Libertadores 1991 by Josef Bobrowsky and Ricardo Pontes at rsssf.
Supercopa 1990 by Julio Bovi Diogo at rsssf